Belvoir is a census-designated place within Belvoir Township, Pitt County, North Carolina, United States. As of the 2010 census it had a population of 307.

It is located six miles northwest of Greenville along North Carolina Highway 222.

Demographics

References

Census-designated places in Pitt County, North Carolina
Census-designated places in North Carolina